Ray Wittelsberger (March 16, 1925 – August 29, 1980) was an American field hockey player. He competed in the men's tournament at the 1956 Summer Olympics.

References

External links
 

1925 births
1980 deaths
American male field hockey players
Olympic field hockey players of the United States
Field hockey players at the 1956 Summer Olympics
Sportspeople from Baltimore